The 4 Lexington Avenue Express is a rapid transit service in the A Division of the New York City Subway. Its route emblem, or "bullet", is colored  since it uses the IRT Lexington Avenue Line in Manhattan.

The 4 operates at all times. Daytime service operates between Woodlawn in the Bronx and Utica Avenue in Crown Heights, Brooklyn, via the IRT Jerome Avenue Line in the Bronx, express via the Lexington Avenue Line in Manhattan, and the IRT Eastern Parkway Line in Brooklyn; limited rush hour service, as well as late night service, is extended beyond Utica Avenue to/from New Lots Avenue in East New York, Brooklyn via the IRT New Lots Line. During rush hours in the peak direction, 4 trains skip 138th Street–Grand Concourse. Late night service makes all stops except for Hoyt Street.

Until 1983, rush hour 4 trains originated and terminated at Flatbush Avenue–Brooklyn College in Brooklyn.

Service history

Under the Interborough Rapid Transit
Service on what was later known as the 4 began on June 2, 1917, as the first portion of the IRT Jerome Avenue Line opened between 149th Street—Grand Concourse and Kingsbridge Road. Since the extension of the IRT Lexington Avenue Line between 149th Street and Grand Central was not yet open, this section was served by shuttle trains using elevated train cars. On April 15, 1918, with the extension of the Jerome Avenue Line to Woodlawn, shuttle service was also extended. On July 17, 1918, the Lexington Avenue Line local tracks were opened, allowing another shuttle service to run between 149th Street–Grand Concourse and Grand Central. On August 1, 1918, the entire Jerome and Lexington Avenue Lines were completed and the connection to the IRT Broadway–Seventh Avenue Line at 42nd Street was removed. Trains began running between 167th Street and Bowling Green, with shuttles to Woodlawn.

On December 11, 1921, Lexington Avenue–Jerome Avenue subway trains began running north of 167th Street at all times, replacing elevated trains, which ran to Woodlawn during rush hours, but from then on terminated at 167th Street during non-rush hours.

At a hearing of the New York State Transit Commission on October 15, 1924, about where it planned to allocate the second 100 of 350 new steel cars, it was announced that service on the IRT Eastern Parkway Line from Atlantic Avenue to Livonia Avenue was almost certainly going to be increased by 25 to 50% in the coming six to eight weeks. Two options were discussed at the hearing. The commission, in response to intense requests from riders on the line, called for the introduction of express service between Atlantic Avenue and Utica Avenue on tracks which had been unused since the line's opening in 1920. It proposed extending half of 4 trains from Atlantic Avenue to New Lots Avenue, running express to Utica Avenue. The introduction of express service would have made it possible to run 30 more trains per hour east of Atlantic Avenue (27 trains per hour had been operating), decreasing overcrowding from 325% to 185%. The plan preferred by the IRT was to place 70 cars on the West Side Line for service to Flatbush Avenue, and Pennsylvania Avenue and New Lots Avenue, and 40 additional cars for service along Eastern Parkway.

On November 17, 1924, the Transit Commission ordered the IRT to use 100 new subway cars to increase service by no later than December 1. Among the changes in service ordered was the operation of through service on the 4 between Kingsbridge Road and Woodlawn, eliminating shuttle service. This change was made possible by twenty of the new cars. The Transit Commission heeded the IRT's recommendation not to have half of 4 trains run express due to the dangerous operating condition it would have created. The IRT stated that two minutes would not be enough time to turn around trains terminating at Atlantic Avenue while maintaining the headway between trains and that this service pattern would risk train collisions. Operating this service pattern would have required  minutes to turn around trains, which would reduce capacity by 25%. While operating all 4 trains to Utica Avenue would have obviated the problem, the IRT did not have enough cars to run such a service. Instead, the Transit Commission accepted the IRT's plan to allocate 70 new cars to West Side express service to Brooklyn. Express service along Eastern Parkway would start at the earliest in February 1925 when additional new cars arrived.

Beginning on November 4, 1925, 4 trains were extended from Atlantic Avenue to Utica Avenue during rush hours, from 6:30 to 9:30 a.m. and 5 to 7 p.m., allowing for the introduction of express service along this section of the IRT Eastern Parkway Line. This extension was made possible by the delivery of the last of 350 new steel cars. The increased service required 80 cars, or eight trains of ten cars each.

On November 23, 1927, evening 4 service was extended from Atlantic Avenue to Utica Avenue between 7:14 and 8:00 p.m. After the Transit Commission determined that this was not a sufficient increase in service, it announced on November 26 that evening 4 service to Utica Avenue would continue until 1 a.m. This change took place on December 5, and increased service between Atlantic Avenue and Utica Avenue by 100%. The following year, midday 4 service also went to Utica Avenue.

In April 1930, service was increased from running every 6 minutes to every 5 minutes heading southbound at 125th Street between 6 and 8 p.m. and from running every 8 minutes to every 6 minutes northbound at 125th Street between 7:30 and 9:00 p.m. In addition, trains that had formerly terminated at South Ferry from 7:26 p.m. to 8:44 p.m. were extended to Utica Avenue.

The span of Sunday express service from Utica Avenue was extended by 54 minutes on February 22, 1931, with express service beginning at 12:56 p.m. instead of 1:50 p.m. Effective April 13, 1931, trains that terminated at Atlantic Avenue between 12:45 and 2:45 a.m. on Mondays were extended to Utica Avenue to reduce a transfer for riders at Nevins Street, and to provide service from Manhattan's East Side to Utica Avenue every ten minutes. On July 12, 1931, Sunday late night trains that terminated at Atlantic Avenue until 2:40 a.m. were extended to Utica Avenue.

As of 1934, 4 trains ran from Woodlawn to Utica Avenue weekday rush and Saturday morning peak and afternoon, to Atlantic Avenue weekday midday, Saturday morning after the peak, and late nights, and to South Ferry evenings and Sundays. Trains ran express in Manhattan except during late nights, and in Brooklyn. This was the first time the 6 became the Pelham Shuttle between Pelham Bay Park and 125th Street–Lexington Avenue.

On August 20, 1938, Saturday morning after the peak service was extended to Utica Avenue.

Under the New York City Board of Transportation

Beginning on May 10, 1946, all 4 trains were made express during late nights running on twelve-minute headways as the 6 went back to Brooklyn Bridge during that time. Previously 4 trains ran local from 12:30 to 5:30 a.m. At this time 4 trains terminated at Atlantic Avenue.

Beginning on December 16, 1946, trains were extended from Atlantic Avenue to New Lots Avenue during late nights, running express between Atlantic and Franklin Avenues.

The New York City Board of Transportation, a predecessor to the New York City Transit Authority, began to introduce replacements to older subway cars beginning with the R12 cars in 1948. With these cars, numbers were publicly designated to the former IRT lines. Lexington–Jerome trains were assigned the number 4. By 1964, all cars had the route numbers on them.

During 1950, Saturday morning service was cut back to South Ferry.

Starting on December 15, 1950, four 4 trains began operating during rush hours in the peak direction to and from Flatbush Avenue on the Nostrand Avenue Line, with the four trains in the AM rush hour leaving every 16 minutes between 7:59 and 8:47 a.m., and the four trains in the PM rush hour arriving every 16–20 minutes between 5:20 and 6:13 p.m. Also on that day, weekday midday service was cut back from Atlantic Avenue to South Ferry. Additionally, on January 18, 1952, 4 service to Atlantic Avenue during weekday middays was restored.

Under the New York City Transit Authority

On March 19, 1954, late-night service in Brooklyn became local, but resumed operating express between Atlantic and Franklin Avenues on June 29, 1956.

On May 3, 1957, the weekday rush trains to Flatbush Avenue were discontinued, while at the same time evening, Saturday and Sunday afternoon trains were extended to Utica Avenue, while Sunday morning trains were extended to Atlantic Avenue.

Starting on March 1, 1960, late-night 4 trains resumed making all stops in Manhattan; this was the first time the 4 and 6 ran local in Manhattan together late nights. This arrangement ended on October 17, 1965, when the 4 went back express in Manhattan late nights.

Beginning on April 8, 1960, nearly all morning rush hour 4 trains ran to Flatbush Avenue, and evening rush hour 4 trains alternated between Flatbush and Utica Avenues. During weekday evenings and late nights 4 trains also went to Flatbush Avenue, making all stops in Brooklyn. On November 14, 1966, three trains that terminated at Utica Avenue were rerouted to terminate at Flatbush Avenue.

As a result of the opening of the main portion of the Chrystie Street Connection along the Manhattan Bridge on November 26, 1967, the 4 train was color-coded magenta under the first color scheme. The color coding of lines was introduced as a matter of having a universal system of signage and nomenclature.

By 1972, the 4 began to skip 138th Street weekdays during rush hours in the peak direction which it continues to do (mornings to Manhattan and evenings from there). At that time, the 4 went to Atlantic Avenue at all times, but was extended to Utica Avenue rush hours running express in Brooklyn along Eastern Parkway. Select 4 trains also ran to Flatbush Avenue rush hours as well running express between Atlantic and Franklin Avenues, and late-night service made all stops in Brooklyn to Flatbush Avenue.

On May 23, 1976, Sunday morning trains were extended to Utica Avenue, running express in Brooklyn.

Effective June 1979, the 4 train assumed its current line color of forest green as a result of a nomenclature update to assign colors to a trunk line, plus line colors not serving Manhattan.

This service cut affected 15,000 riders, and was criticized by Manhattan Borough President Andrew Stein as no public hearing was held.

On July 10, 1983, rush hour 4 trains were rerouted from Flatbush Avenue to Utica Avenue, and late evening and late night and Sunday morning service was rerouted from Flatbush Avenue to New Lots Avenue, making all local stops.

On August 29, 1988, weekday midday 4 trains were extended from Atlantic Avenue to Utica Avenue, made possible by the termination of 5 service at Bowling Green. In addition, service was increased 50% during evenings between 8 p.m. and midnight, on Saturday afternoon and on Sunday between 10 a.m. and 7 p.m. In January 1989, during middays, southbound service resumed operating express between Franklin Avenue and Utica Avenue following the elimination of 5 train layups.

Late night express service was reinstated from January 21, 1990 to October 5 of that year, as a result of the 6 being extended back to Brooklyn Bridge during that time. While late night 6 service to Brooklyn Bridge was permanently restored on October 3, 1999, the 4 continued to run local at those times, providing Lexington Avenue local stations service every ten minutes.

Recent changes 

From April 2000 to August 2001, midday 4 service was temporarily cut back from Utica Avenue to Atlantic Avenue to accommodate the rebuilding of the IRT New Lots Line. 3 train service was split into two sections to allow for the line to be rebuilt, with transfers available at Utica Avenue. Work took place on weekday middays between 10 a.m. and 3 p.m., and New Lots service operated in one of three ways: shuttle buses replaced trains, all trains operated in both directions on a single track, or shuttle trains ran. 4 trains terminated at Atlantic Avenue when shuttle or single-track trains were in operation.

From June 8, 2009, to June 26, 2009, New York City Transit conducted a pilot program for express Jerome Avenue Line service. During a one hour period, four morning weekday rush hour trains from Woodlawn only stopped at Mosholu Parkway, Burnside Avenue and 149th Street–Grand Concourse before resuming regular service in Manhattan and Brooklyn. The express was expected to save riders  minutes. The pilot was made possible due to signaling upgrades to the line's center track made as part of the 2005—2009 Metropolitan Transportation Authority Capital Program.

On July 6, 2009, select Bronx-bound 4 trains began running express from 167th Street to Burnside Avenue to terminate at the latter station before running out of service to the Jerome Yard.

On October 26, 2009, another 4 express pilot program was implemented based on the success of the first and ran until December 11, 2009. This program was the same as the one in June except that express trains stopped at Bedford Park Boulevard–Lehman College. This express service was expected to cut runtime by 4 minutes.

On November 17, 2019, New York City Transit cut weekday evening 3, 4 and 5 service in order to accommodate planned subway work. This change, which was approved by the MTA Board on June 27, 2019, started late night 4 service to New Lots Avenue, an hour earlier, at 10:30 p.m. instead of 11:30 p.m., replacing 3 service, which was cut back to Times Square–42nd Street. These changes in service were expected to save the agency $900,000 annually.

Route

Service pattern 
The following table shows the lines used by the 4, with shaded boxes indicating the route at the specified times:

Stations 

For a more detailed station listing, see the articles on the lines listed above.

Notes

References

External links 

 MTA NYC Transit – 4 Lexington Avenue Express
 
 

New York City Subway services